Judah Maccabee (or Judas Maccabeus, also spelled Machabeus, or Maccabæus, Hebrew: יהודה המכבי,  Yehudah HaMakabi) was a Jewish priest (kohen) and a son of the priest Mattathias. He led the Maccabean Revolt against the Seleucid Empire (167–160 BCE).

The Jewish holiday of Hanukkah ("Dedication") commemorates the restoration of Jewish worship at the Second Temple in Jerusalem in 164 BCE, after Judah Maccabee removed all of the statues depicting Greek gods and goddesses and purified it.

Life

Early life 
Judah was the third son of Mattathias the Hasmonean, a Jewish priest from the village of Modi'in. In 167 BCE Mattathias, together with his sons Judah, Eleazar, Simon, John, and Jonathan, started a revolt against the Seleucid ruler Antiochus IV Epiphanes, who since 175 BCE had issued decrees that forbade Jewish religious practices. After Mattathias's death in 166 BCE, Judah assumed leadership of the revolt in accordance with the deathbed disposition of his father. The First Book of Maccabees praises Judah's valor and military talent, suggesting that those qualities made Judah a natural choice for the new commander.

Origin of the name "The Hammer" 
In the early days of the rebellion, Judah received a surname Maccabee. It is not known whether this surname should be understood in Greek, Hebrew or Aramaic. Several explanations have been put forward for this surname. One suggestion is that the name derives from the Aramaic maqqaba ("makebet" in modern Hebrew), "hammer" or "sledgehammer" (cf. the cognomen of Charles Martel, the 8th century Frankish leader), in recognition of his ferocity in battle. Others believe it is in reference to his weapon of choice.

According to Jewish folklore the name Maccabee is an acronym of the verse Mi kamokha ba'elim Adonai, "Who among the gods is like you, O Adonai?", the Maccabean battle-cry to motivate troops. (Exodus 15:11). Some scholars maintain that the name is a shortened form of the Hebrew maqqab-Yahu (from naqab, "to mark, to designate"), meaning "the one designated by Yahweh." Although originally the surname Maccabee was exclusive to Judah (his brothers had different surnames), at a later date it came to signify all the Hasmoneans who fought during the Maccabean revolt.

Early victories 

Mindful of the superiority of Seleucid forces during the first two years of the revolt, Judah's strategy was to avoid any engagement with their regular army, and to resort to guerrilla warfare, in order to give them a feeling of insecurity. The strategy enabled Judah to win a string of victories. At the battle of Nahal el-Haramiah (wadi haramia), he defeated a small Seleucid force under the command of Apollonius, governor of Samaria, who was killed. Judah took possession of Apollonius's sword and used it until his death as a symbol of vengeance. After Nahal el-Haramiah, recruits flocked to the Jewish cause.

Shortly thereafter, Judah routed a larger Seleucid army under the command of Seron near Beth-Horon, largely thanks to a good choice of battlefield. Then in the Battle of Emmaus, Judah proceeded to defeat the Seleucid forces led by generals Nicanor and Gorgias. This force was dispatched by Lysias, whom Antiochus left as viceroy after departing on a campaign against the Parthians. By a forced night march, Judah succeeded in eluding Gorgias, who had intended to attack and destroy the Jewish forces in their camp with his cavalry. While Gorgias was searching for him in the mountains, Judah made a surprise attack upon the Seleucid camp and defeated the Seleucids at the Battle of Emmaus. The Seleucid commander had no alternative but to withdraw to the coast.

The defeat at Emmaus convinced Lysias that he must prepare for a serious and prolonged war. He accordingly assembled a new and larger army and marched with it on Judea from the south via Idumea. After several years of conflict Judah drove out his foes from Jerusalem, except for the garrison in the citadel of Acra. He purified the defiled Temple of Jerusalem and on the 25th of Kislev (December 14, 164 BCE) restored the service in the Temple. The reconsecration of the Temple became a permanent Jewish holiday, Hanukkah, which continued even after the Temple was destroyed in 70 CE. Hanukkah is still celebrated annually. The liberation of Jerusalem was the first step on the road to ultimate independence.

After Jerusalem 

Upon hearing the news that the Jewish communities in Gilead, Transjordan, and Galilee were under attack by neighboring Greek cities, Judah immediately went to their aid. Judah sent his brother, Simeon, to Galilee at the head of 3,000 men; Simeon was successful, achieving numerous victories. He transplanted a substantial portion of the Jewish settlements, including women and children, to Judea. Judah personally led the campaign in Transjordan, taking with him his brother Jonathan. After fierce fighting, he defeated the Transjordanian tribes and rescued the Jews concentrated in fortified towns in Gilead. The Jewish population of the areas taken by the Maccabees was evacuated to Judea. At the conclusion of the fighting in Transjordan, Judah turned against the Edomites in the south, captured and destroyed Hebron and Maresha. He then marched on the coast of the Mediterranean, destroyed the altars and statues of the pagan gods in Ashdod, and returned to Judea with much spoils.

Judah then laid siege to the Seleucid garrison at the Acra, the Seleucid citadel of Jerusalem. The besieged, who included not only Syrian-Greek troops but also Hellenistic Jews, appealed for help to Lysias, who effectively became the regent of the young king Antiochus V Eupator after the death of Antiochus Epiphanes at the end of 164 BCE during the Parthian campaign. Lysias together with Eupator set out for a new campaign in Judea. Lysias skirted Judea as he had done in his first campaign, entering it from the south, and besieged Beth-Zur. Judah raised the siege of the Acra and went to meet Lysias. In the Battle of Beth-zechariah, south of Bethlehem, the Seleucids achieved their first major victory over the Maccabees, and Judah was forced to withdraw to Jerusalem. Beth-Zur was compelled to surrender and Lysias reached Jerusalem, laying siege to the city. The defenders found themselves in a precarious situation because their provisions were exhausted, it being a sabbatical year during which the fields were left uncultivated. However, just as capitulation seemed imminent, Lysias and Eupator had to withdraw when Antiochus Epiphanes's commander-in-chief Philip, whom the late ruler appointed regent before his death, rebelled against Lysias and was about to enter Antioch and seize power. Lysias decided to propose a peaceful settlement, which was concluded at the end of 163 BCE. The terms of peace were based on the restoration of religious freedom, the permission for the Jews to live in accordance with their own laws, and the official return of the Temple to the Jews. Lysias defeated Philip, only to be overthrown by Demetrius, son of the late Seleucus IV Philopator; returned from years as a hostage in Rome. Demetrius appointed Alcimus (Jakim), a Hellenist Jew, as high priest, a choice the Hasidim (Pietists) might have accepted since he was of priestly descent.

Internal conflict 

When war against the external enemy came to an end, an internal struggle broke out between the party led by Judah and the Hellenist party. The influence of the Hellenizers all but collapsed in the wake of the Seleucid defeat. The Hellenizing High Priest Menelaus was removed from office and executed. His successor was another Hellenizer Alcimus. When Alcimus executed sixty priests who were opposed to him, he found himself in open conflict with the Maccabees. Alcimus fled from Jerusalem and went to the Seleucid king, asking for help.

Meanwhile, Demetrius I Soter, son of Seleucus IV Philopator and nephew of the late Antiochus IV Epiphanes, fled from Rome in defiance of the Roman Senate, arrived in Syria. Declaring himself the rightful king, he captured and killed Lysias and Antiochus Eupator, taking the throne. It was thus Demetrius to whom the delegation led by Alcimus, complained of the persecution of the Hellenist party in Judea. Demetrius granted Alcimus's request to be appointed High Priest under the protection of the king's army and sent to Judea an army led by Bacchides. The weaker Jewish army couldn't oppose the enemy and withdrew from Jerusalem, so Judah returned to wage guerrilla warfare. Soon after, it was necessary for the Seleucid Army to return to Antioch because of the turbulent political situation. Judah's forces returned to Jerusalem and the Seleucids dispatched another army, again led by Nicanor. In a battle near Adasa, on the 13th Adar 161 BCE, the Seleucid army was destroyed and Nicanor was killed. The annual "Day of Nicanor" was instituted to commemorate this victory.

Agreement with Rome and death 

It was the first recorded contract between the Jewish people and the Romans.

The agreement with Rome failed to have any effect on Demetrius' policy. On receipt of the news of Nicanor's defeat, he dispatched a new army, again commanded by Bacchides. This time the Seleucid forces of 20,000 men were numerically so superior that most of Judah's men left the field of battle and advised their leader to do likewise and to await a more favorable opportunity. However, Judah decided to stand his ground.

In the Battle of Elasa, Judah and those who remained faithful to him were killed. His body was taken by his brothers from the battlefield and buried in the family sepulchre at Modiin. The death of Judah Maccabee (d. 160 BCE) stirred the Jews to renewed resistance. After several additional years of war under the leadership of two of Mattathias' other sons (Jonathan and Simon), the Jews finally achieved independence and the liberty to worship freely.

In the arts

Pre-19th century 
As warrior hero and national liberator, Judah Maccabee has inspired many writers, and several artists and composers. In the Divine Comedy, Dante sees his spirit in the Heaven of Mars with the other "heroes of the true faith". In Shakespeare's Love's Labour's Lost, he is enacted along with the other Nine Worthies, but heckled for sharing a name with Judas Iscariot. Most significant works dedicated solely to him date from the 17th century onwards. William Houghton's Judas Maccabaeus, performed in about 1601 but now lost, is thought to have been the first drama on the theme; however, Judas Macabeo, an early comedia by crucial Spanish playwright Pedro Calderón de la Barca is extant. Fernando Rodríguez-Gallego details its history in his critical edition: the play was performed in the 1620s in different versions and finally published as part of an anthology by Vera Tassis in 1637. Following on its heels is El Macabeo (Naples, 1638), a Castilian epic by the Portuguese Marrano Miguel de Silveyra. Two other 17th century works are La chevalerie de Judas Macabé by French poet Pierre Du Ries, and the anonymous neo-Latin work Judas Machabaeus (Rome, 1695). Handel wrote his Judas Maccabaeus oratorio (1746) on the subject.

19th century 

There has been interest in Judah in every century. Giuda Macabeo, ossia la morte di Nicanore... (1839), is an Italian "azione sacra" based on which Vallicella composed an oratorio. One of the best-known literary works on the theme is Judas Maccabaeus (1872), a five-act verse tragedy by Henry Wadsworth Longfellow. A Hebrew version of Longfellow's play was published in 1900. Two later 19th-century interpretations of the story are Judas Makkabaeus, a novella by the German writer Josef Eduard Konrad Bischoff, which appeared in Der Gefangene von Kuestrin (1885), and The Hammer (1890), a book by Alfred J. Church and Richmond Seeley.

20th century 
Several 20th-century Jewish authors have also written works devoted to Judah Maccabee and the Maccabean Revolt. Jacob Benjamin Katznelson (1855–1930) wrote the poem, "Alilot Gibbor ha-Yehudim Yehudah ha-Makkabi le-Veit ha-Hashmona'im" (1922); the Yiddish writer Moses Schulstein wrote the dramatic poem, "Yehudah ha-Makkabi" (in A Layter tsu der Zun, 1954); Jacob Fichman's "Yehudah ha-Makkabi" is one of the heroic tales included in Sippurim le-Mofet (1954). Amit Arad's historical novel "Lions of Judea – The miraculous story of the Maccabees" (2014). Many children's plays have also been written on the theme by various Jewish authors.

In addition, the American writer Howard Fast penned the historical novel, My Glorious Brothers, which was published in 1948, during the 1947–1949 Palestine war.

During World War II the Swiss-German writer Karl Boxler published his novel Judas Makkabaeus; ein Kleinvolk kaempft um Glaube und Heimat (1943), the subtitle of which suggests that Swiss democrats then drew a parallel between their own national hero, William Tell, and the leader of the Maccabean revolt against foreign tyranny.

The modern play Playing Dreidel with Judah Maccabee by Edward Einhorn is about a contemporary boy who meets the historical figure.

Visual arts 

In the medieval Christian art, Judah Maccabee was regarded as one of the heroes of the Old Testament. He figures in a tenth-century illustrated manuscript Libri Maccabaeorum. The late medieval French artist Jean Fouquet painted an illustration of Judah triumphing over his enemies for his famous manuscript of Josephus. Rubens painted Judah Maccabee praying for the dead; the painting illustrates an episode from 2 Maccabees 12:39–48 in which Judah's troops find stolen idolatrous charms on the corpses of Jewish warriors slain on the battlefield. He therefore offers prayers and an expiatory sacrifice for these warriors who have died in a state of sin. During the Counter-Reformation the passage was used by Catholics against Protestants in order to justify the doctrine of purgatory. Accordingly, Rubens painted the scene for the Chapel of the Dead in Tournai cathedral. In the 19th century, Paul Gustave Doré executed an engraving of Judah Maccabee victoriously pursuing the shattered troops of the Syrian enemy.

Music 
In music, almost all the compositions inspired by the Hasmonean rebellion revolve around Judah. In 1746, the composer George Frideric Handel composed his oratorio Judas Maccabeus, putting the biblical story in the context of the Jacobite rising of 1745. This work, with libretto by Thomas Morell, had been written for the celebrations following the Duke of Cumberland's victory over the Scottish Jacobite rebels at the Battle of Culloden in 1746. The oratorio's most famous chorus is "See, the conqu'ring hero comes". The tune of this chorus was later adopted as a Christian Easter hymn tune Thine Be The Glory, Risen Conquering Son. A Hebrew translation of Handel's Judas Maccabee’' was prepared for the 1932 Maccabiah Games and is now popular in Israel with the motif of "conqu'ring hero" becoming a Hanukkah song. Beethoven composed a set of theme and variations 12 Variations on 'See the conqu'ring hero comes''' for Cello and Piano, WoO 45.

Tom Lehrer refers to Judas Maccabeus in his song "Hanukkah in Santa Monica".

Mirah refers to Judah Maccabee in her song "Jerusalem".

In "The Goldbergs Mixtape", a parody song is named "Judah Macabee".

 See also 
Jewish leadership
List of Hasmonean and Herodian rulers
Nine Worthies

 References 

 Further reading 
 Schalit, Abraham (1997). "Judah Maccabee". Encyclopaedia Judaica (CD-ROM Edition Version 1.0). Ed. Cecil Roth. Keter Publishing House. 
 Schäfer, Peter (2003). The History of the Jews in the Greco-Roman World. Routledge. 

 External links 

 The Hasmoneans on the Web (Resource Index)
Judas Maccabeus on the Web (pictures and directory)
Jewish Encyclopedia
Catholic Encyclopedia
Judah Maccabee
"Under the Influence: Hellenism in Ancient Jewish Life"  Biblical Archaeology Society
Who Was Judah Maccabee? by Dr. Henry Abramson
 Lions of Judea'', novel series by Amit Arad

160 BC deaths
2nd-century BCE High Priests of Israel
2nd-century BC Hasmonean rulers
Hasmonean dynasty
Military personnel killed in action
People in the deuterocanonical books
Year of birth unknown
Maccabees
2nd-century BCE Jews
Jewish priests
Gilead